Tigh Zamin (also Romanized as Tīgh Zamīn; also known as Āhangar Maḩalleh and Angar Maḩalleh) is a village in Qaleh Qafeh Rural District, in the Central District of Minudasht County, Golestan Province, Iran. At the 2006 census, its population was 347, in 84 families.

References 

Populated places in Minudasht County